The Ultima Mk1 is a mid-engined concept kit car produced by Noble Motorsport Ltd in 1983 (the company later became Ultima Sports when Ted Marlow and Richard Marlow bought the rights in 1992). The Mk1 was intended to go into production, but before any sold the Ultima Mk2 was introduced, and thus only one Mk1 was made.

Required donor parts 
As the Ultima Mk1 was a kit car, it required a variety of donor parts to complete. The Mk1 uses the 2.6L V6 and five-speed transaxle from the Renault 30 as well as that car's driveshafts, hubs, wheel bearings and gear lever. It also uses the steering components, front uprights, front hubs, front brakes and handbrake lever from the Mk3 Ford Cortina as well as the radiator from the Austin Princess and rear calipers from the Lancia Beta.

Performance 
The Mk1 features a square tube space frame chassis and gull-wing doors. Its powered by the 2.6L (2664cc) V6 PRV engine and five-speed transaxle from the Renault 30 producing 96 kW (128.7 hp, 130 PS).

References 
Rear mid-engine, rear-wheel-drive vehicles
Sports cars
First car made by manufacturer
Cars introduced in 1983
Concept cars
Automobiles with gull-wing doors

Kit cars
Ultima vehicles